Sharplin v Henderson [1990] 2 NZLR 134 is a cited case in New Zealand regarding the requirement under section 7(4)(b) of the Contractual Remedies Act 1970 that a breach of a contract must be "substantial" for a contract to be cancelled.

Background
Sharplin purchased a Tauranga orchard from Henderson.

After the sale, it was discovered that the real estate agent had misrepresented that 900 trees belonged to the property, representing 25% of the property.

Sharplin sued for misrepresentation.

Held
The misrepresentation was substantial, and relief was granted.

References

New Zealand contract case law
Court of Appeal of New Zealand cases
1990 in New Zealand law
1990 in case law